= Djibouti Youth Movement =

The Djibouti Youth Movement (French: Mouvement de la jeunesse djiboutienne) was a militant organization which claimed responsibility for two grenade attacks in Djibouti on 27 September 1990. This event was the first international public exposure of the organization.

The first attack on the Café de Paris killed one French boy and wounded 15 French adults. During the second attack, on the Café L'Historil, the grenades failed to explode and there were no casualties.

== Sources ==
- Chronology of Significant Terrorist Events, 1961-2005. Berkshire Publishing Group.
